Xinxiang railway station is a railway station in Weibin District, Xinxiang, Henan, China. The station is on Beijing–Guangzhou railway, and serves as the eastern terminus of Xinxiang–Yueshan railway and the western terminus of Xinxiang–Yanzhou railway.

History
The station was established in 1905 as Xinxiang County railway station.

Station layout
The station has 9 platforms (1 side platform and 4 island platforms) and 10 tracks.

See also
Xinxiang East railway station

References

Railway stations in Henan
Stations on the Xinxiang–Yueshan Railway
Stations on the Beijing–Guangzhou Railway
Railway stations in China opened in 1905